Bernabò is an Italian given name and surname, a variant of Barnabas. Notable people with the name include:

 Bernabò Visconti (1323–1385), Italian soldier
 Valerio Bernabò (born 1986), Italian rugby union player
 Luigi Bernabò Brea (1910–1999), Italian archaeologist